Anggello Machuca (born 14 September 1984) is a Paraguayan professional footballer who currently plays as a forward.

References

External links
Anggello Machuca profile at Thai Premier League Official Website

1984 births
Living people
Paraguayan footballers
Anggello Machuca
Anggello Machuca
Anggello Machuca
Paraguayan expatriate footballers
Expatriate footballers in Thailand
Expatriate footballers in Vietnam
Association football midfielders
Anggello Machuca
Paraguayan expatriate sportspeople in Thailand